State Road 610 (NM 610) is a  state highway in the US state of New Mexico. NM 610's southern terminus is at NM 602 in Gallup, and the northern terminus is at NM 609 in Gallup.

Major intersections

See also

References

610
Transportation in McKinley County, New Mexico
Gallup, New Mexico